Anna Bogdanova (born 21 October 1984) is a Russian heptathlete. Bogdanova was the bronze medallist at the 2008 IAAF World Indoor Championships and placed sixth at the 2008 Summer Olympics. She won at the European Athletics Indoor Championships the following year. In professional competitions she placed third at the 2008 Hypo-Meeting.

International competitions

See also
List of IAAF World Indoor Championships medalists (women)
List of European Athletics Indoor Championships medalists (women)

References

1984 births
Living people
Russian heptathletes
Olympic heptathletes
Olympic athletes of Russia
Athletes (track and field) at the 2008 Summer Olympics
World Athletics Championships athletes for Russia
European Athletics Indoor Championships winners
Russian Athletics Championships winners